Benjamin Anzelwitz, known professionally as Ben Bernie (May 30, 1891 – October 23, 1943), was an American jazz violinist, bandleader, and radio personality, often introduced as "The Old Maestro". He was noted for his showmanship and memorable bits of snappy dialogue, being part of the first generation of "stars" of American popular music, alongside other artists such as Paul Whiteman (a fellow violinist and bandleader), Ted Lewis and Al Jolson.

Career

Early years
Bernie was born Bernard Anzelevitz (another source says Benjamin Anzelevitz) in Bayonne, New Jersey. He attended Columbia University and the New York College of Music. By the age of 15 he was teaching violin, but this experience apparently diminished his interest in the violin for a time.

Bernie performed in vaudeville, appearing with Charles Klass as The Fiddle Up Boys in 1912 and with Phil Baker as Baker and Bernie, but he met with little success until 1922 when he joined his first orchestra. Later, he had his own band, The Lads, seen in the early DeForest Phonofilm sound short, Ben Bernie and All the Lads (1924–25), featuring pianist Oscar Levant. He toured with Maurice Chevalier in Europe.

Radio and other performances

Bernie and his orchestra were heard November 15, 1926, via a remote broadcast from the Hotel Roosevelt in New York City, on the first NBC broadcast. In 1928, he starred in the Broadway musical, Here's Howe, as Dan Danny.

His musical variety radio shows through the 1930s, usually titled, Ben Bernie, The Old Maestro received ratings that placed him among radio's top ten programs. He was heard on radio as early as 1923, broadcasting on WJZ and the NBC Blue Network in 1930–31, sponsored by Mennen. After a 1931–32 run on CBS, sponsored by Blue Ribbon Malt, which was acquired by Pabst Beer (during Prohibition, they sold malt syrup, the primary ingredient in brewing "homemade beer"), he was heard Tuesdays on NBC from 1932–1935, also with Pabst. His announcer during this period was Jimmy Wallington.

On the Blue Network from 1935–1937, Bernie's sponsor was the American Can Company. He returned to CBS in 1938, sponsored by U.S. Rubber. With Half-&-Half Tobacco as a sponsor, he hosted a musical quiz program from 1938 to 1940. From 1940–41, Bromo-Seltzer was his sponsor on the Blue Network. Wrigley's Gum sponsored The Ben Bernie War Workers' Program (1941–43). He also made guest appearances on other radio shows. He appeared in four feature films Shoot the Works (1934), Stolen Harmony (1935),Wake Up and Live (1937), and Love and Hisses (1937)

His theme was "It's a Lonesome Old Town" and his signature trademark, "yowsah, yowsah, yowsah" (also spelled "yowsa" or "yowza"), became a national catchphrase. The term was memorably used by a character in the film They Shoot Horses, Don't They? (1969), Richie Cunningham in a 1976 episode of Happy Days, "They Shoot Fonzies, Don't They?" (1976), by the band Chic with their hit "Dance, Dance, Dance (Yowsah, Yowsah, Yowsah)" (1977), Frank Zappa in his 1979 single "Dancin' Fool" and Ritch Brinkley as Cappy in 1994's comedy, Cabin Boy.

Announcers for Bernie's programs included Harlow Wilcox, Harry von Zell and Bob Brown. His radio shows featured comedy from Lew Lehr and Fuzzy Knight, and the line-up of vocalists included Buddy Clark, Little Jackie Heller, Scrappy Lambert, Pat Kennedy, Jane Pickens, Dinah Shore, and Mary Small.

To boost ratings, Walter Winchell and Bernie, who were good friends, staged a fake rivalry similar to the comedic conflict between Jack Benny and Fred Allen. This mutually beneficial "feud" was a running gag on their radio appearances and continued in two films in which they portrayed themselves: Wake Up and Live (1937) and Love and Hisses (1937). They are also caricatured in the Warner Bros. cartoons The Woods Are Full of Cuckoos (1937) as "Ben Birdie" and "Walter Finchell" and The Coo-Coo Nut Grove (1936) as "Ben Birdie" and "Walter Windpipe".

Recordings
Bernie's orchestra recorded throughout the 1920s and 1930s on Vocalion (1922–25), Brunswick (1925–33), Columbia (1933), Decca (1936), and ARC (Vocalion and OKeh) (1939–40). In 1923 Bernie and the Hotel Roosevelt Orchestra recorded "Who's Sorry Now?".

In 1925 Ben Bernie and his orchestra recorded "Sweet Georgia Brown". Bernie was the co-composer of this jazz standard, which became the theme song of the Harlem Globetrotters.

Personal life

On December 24, 1915, Bernie married Rose Harris (maiden; 1893–1965) in Manhattan, New York.  They had a son, Jason H. Bernie (1918–1969).  Ben and Rose Bernie separated in September 1931 and divorced September 1935.  In October 1935, Ben Bernie remarried Dorothy P. Wesley (1908–1990) in Miami, Florida.

Bernie died from a pulmonary embolism in October 1943, aged 52, and was buried in Mount Hebron Cemetery, in Queens, New York.

Bernie has a star at 6280 Hollywood Boulevard in the Radio section of the Hollywood Walk of Fame. It was dedicated February 8, 1960.

Selected discography
 "Sweet Georgia Brown" July 1925 (#1 hit for 5 weeks)
 "Sleepy Time Gal" March 1926 (#1 hit for 4 weeks)
 "Ain't She Sweet" May 1927 (#1 hit for 4 weeks)
 "Marching Along Together" August 21, 1933 (Columbia)
 "We Won't Have to Sell the Farm" (Columbia)
 "The Duke Is on a Bat Again" (Columbia)
 "Ain't That Marvelous" (Columbia)
 "This Is Romance" Voc. Frank Prince, Sept. 19, 1933 (Columbia)
 "You Gotta Be a Football Hero", Sept. 19, 1933 (Columbia)
 "Shanghai Lil", Sept. 26, 1933 (Columbia)
 "Who's Afraid of the Big Bad Wolf", Sept. 26, 1933 (Columbia)

References

Bibliography
 Dunning, John. On the Air: The Encyclopedia of Old-Time Radio, Oxford University Press, 1998.

External links

Ben Bernie and All the Lads (1924-25) made in Phonofilm by Lee DeForest
Ben Bernie recordings at the Discography of American Historical Recordings

1891 births
1943 deaths
Deaths from pulmonary embolism
Burials at Mount Hebron Cemetery (New York City)
American jazz bandleaders
American jazz violinists
American male musical theatre actors
American radio bandleaders
American radio personalities
Big band bandleaders
Vaudeville performers
Vocalion Records artists
Brunswick Records artists
Columbia Records artists
Decca Records artists
American male violinists
20th-century American violinists
American male jazz musicians
20th-century American male singers
20th-century American singers